Shanhaiguan railway station is a station located in Shanhaiguan District, Qinhuangdao, Hebei, China. It is the end of the Beijing–Shanhaiguan railway and the start of the Shenyang–Shanhaiguan railway.

Railway stations in Hebei
Stations on the Beijing–Harbin Railway
Stations on the Beijing–Shanhaiguan Railway
Stations on the Shenyang–Shanhaiguan Railway
Stations on the Qinhuangdao–Shenyang High-Speed Railway
Railway stations in China opened in 1894